Logistic Support Battalion  is the only support unit of the Namibian Army based at Grootfontein. The battalion was formed in 1990 at the onset of the formation of the Namibian Defence Force.

Role

The role of the unit is to provide military logistics to the Namibian Army. The unit is supplied by the Composite Depot.

Equipment

The regiment uses the following equipment:
 Wer'wolf MKII
 Ural-375
 Ural-4320
 Steyr 90 series
 MAN KAT1

Leadership

References

Military of Namibia
Otjozondjupa Region